Dayan Town may refer to:
 Dayan or Old Town of Lijiang, World Heritage Site in Yunnan, China
 Dayan Township, in Jiangyou, Sichuan, China
 Dayan in Evenk Banner, Inner Mongolia, China
 Dayan, Fenghua District, Ningbo, Zhejiang, China